Fossarus bellus is a species of sea snail, a marine gastropod mollusc in the family Planaxidae.

Distribution

Description 
The maximum recorded shell length is 3.5 mm.

Habitat 
Minimum recorded depth is 18 m. Maximum recorded depth is 196 m.

References

External links

Planaxidae
Gastropods described in 1889